is a Japanese professional footballer who plays as a defender for Renofa Yamaguchi FC.

References

External links

1999 births
Living people
Japanese footballers
Association football defenders
Yokohama F. Marinos players
Kataller Toyama players
Giravanz Kitakyushu players
Renofa Yamaguchi FC players
J1 League players
J2 League players
J3 League players
Association football people from Kagoshima Prefecture